Fausto Dotti (born 7 June 1968) is an Italian former professional racing cyclist. He rode in one edition of the Tour de France, four editions of the Giro d'Italia and one edition of the Vuelta a España.

References

External links
 

1968 births
Living people
Italian male cyclists
Cyclists from Brescia